Journey Within is a live album by jazz saxophonist Charles Lloyd recorded at the Fillmore Auditorium in San Francisco at the same concert that produced Love-In and performed by the Charles Lloyd Quartet featuring Keith Jarrett, Ron McClure and Jack DeJohnette.

Reception
The Allmusic review awarded the album 3 stars.

Track listing
All compositions by Charles Lloyd except as indicated
 "Journey Within" - 11:29     
 "Love No. 3" (Keith Jarrett) - 5:37     
 "Memphis Green" - 9:15
 "Lonesome Child: Song/Dance" - 10:36
Recorded on January 27, 1967 at the Fillmore Auditorium, San Francisco, California

Personnel
Charles Lloyd - tenor saxophone, flute
Keith Jarrett - piano, soprano saxophone on "Lonesome Child: Song/Dance"
Ron McClure - double-bass
Jack DeJohnette - drums

Production
Wally Heider - recording engineer

References

Charles Lloyd (jazz musician) live albums
1967 live albums
Albums produced by George Avakian
Atlantic Records live albums